Concreteness training (CNT) is the repeated practice of cognitive skills to create habitual behaviors in order to help reduce anxiety and depressive symptoms for those suffering from the disorder of depression. People suffering from depression have a tendency towards unhelpful abstract thinking and negative thoughts, such as viewing a single mistake as evidence that they are useless at everything. As such, CNT involves switching cognitive focus from negative thoughts to positive thoughts so as to cut down on rumination—focused attention on the symptoms of one's distress—and self-criticism, which can cause feelings of inadequacy and raise anxiety. 

This technique was developed at the University of Exeter, located in Exeter, England, by Professor Edward Watkins and his team of researchers after they conducted a study to see if the CNT approach could reduce symptoms of depression and anxiety. In the 2009 study, twenty-one men and thirty-nine women were randomly assigned to one of three groups. The first group received CNT, the second group received bogus concreteness training (BGT), and the third group was a wait-list (WL) control condition that received no treatment. The concreteness training involved practicing thinking about the specific details of recent mild negative events: how the event happened, where it happened, who was there, what they did. The goal was to try to get a mental picture of the event, its circumstances, and then focus on the sequence of how it happened.  Participants received the specific treatment every day for a week based on their assigned group. At the end of the week, participants were again assessed for depression levels and symptoms. Results indicated that CNT showed a trend toward a greater decrease in depressive symptoms than BGT or WL. Accordingly, Professor Watkins noted: “This is the first demonstration that just targeting thinking style can be an effective means of tackling depression. Concreteness training can be delivered with minimal face-to-face contact with a therapist and training could be accessed online, through CDs or through smartphone apps. This has the advantage of making it a relatively cheap form of treatment.”

However, in a study published by Springer Nature in 2013, it was concluded that the effectiveness of CNT may be limited, claiming that while concreteness of thinking increased, results did not support that CNT was effective "as a standalone treatment for depression". In addition, contrary to previous findings, the study also did not find a significant effect on rumination. The potential reasoning behind this lack of effect was "because the sample did not exhibit a significant decrease in depression". Yet, CNT has been proven to be effective when delivered in a specific manner, like therapeutic context, with the rationale that the participant knows he or she is being treated for depressive symptoms by a credible authority. Moreover, results have also demonstrated that CNT is a valid technique in the reduction of self-criticism, especially where the use of self-relevant events (autobiographical materials) has been prevalent.

See also 
 Cognitive psychology
 Management of depression

References

Cognitive psychology